The Higgins-Hodgeman House is a historic house located at 19 Cedar Street in Taunton, Massachusetts.

Description and history 
It was built in 1880 for L. B. Higgins, a merchant who operated a dry goods business downtown. The -story frame house is considered one of the best examples of Stick style architecture in the city. It is roughly rectangular, with a hip roof whose cornice is decorated with Stick style brackets. A gabled section projects slightly on the left side of the front facade, with a projecting bay window at the first floor. The right side of the front is taken up by a hip-roof porch, supported by turned posts, and with a decorative valence. It has retained much of its original wood details and clapboard siding.

The house was listed on the National Register of Historic Places on July 5, 1984.

See also
National Register of Historic Places listings in Taunton, Massachusetts

References

National Register of Historic Places in Taunton, Massachusetts
Houses in Taunton, Massachusetts
Houses on the National Register of Historic Places in Bristol County, Massachusetts